Andrew Matjila (born 1932) is a Namibian politician. A member of the Democratic Turnhalle Alliance, Matjila took part in the Transitional Government of National Unity from 1985 to 1989. Matjila also was a member of the Constituent Assembly of Namibia and the 1st National Assembly of Namibia with the DTA.

References

1932 births
Living people
Members of the National Assembly (Namibia)
Popular Democratic Movement politicians